Abeshki may refer to:
 Abeshki, Razavi Khorasan